The World Unseen is a 2007 historical drama film.

The World Unseen may also refer to:

The World Unseen (novel), 2008 novel based on the film of the same name
The World Unseen (album), 2016 album by Mamiffer